Epichorista emphanes, the beech leafroller, is a species of moth of the family Tortricidae. It is found in New Zealand.

The wingspan is about 14 mm. Adult females are highly variable in appearance.

The larvae have been recorded feeding on Nothofagus solandri.

References

Moths described in 1902
Epichorista
Moths of New Zealand
Endemic fauna of New Zealand
Endemic moths of New Zealand